The Wildcatter is a 1937 American drama film directed by Lewis D. Collins and written by Charles Logue. The film stars Scott Kolk, Jean Rogers, J. Scott Smart, Suzanne Kaaren, Russell Hicks, Ward Bond, Wallis Clark and Jack Powell. The film was released on June 6, 1937, by Universal Pictures.

Plot

Cast        
Scott Kolk as 'Lucky' Conlon 
Jean Rogers as Helen Conlon
J. Scott Smart as Smiley
Suzanne Kaaren as Julia Frayne
Russell Hicks as Tom Frayne
Ward Bond as Johnson
Wallis Clark as Torrance
Jack Powell as Joe Tinker
Milburn Stone as Ed
William Gould as Real Estate Agent
Robert McKenzie as Bill Webster

References

External links
 

1937 films
1930s English-language films
American drama films
1937 drama films
Universal Pictures films
Films directed by Lewis D. Collins
American black-and-white films
1930s American films